The 1988 college football season may refer to:

 1988 NCAA Division I-A football season
 1988 NCAA Division I-AA football season
 1988 NCAA Division II football season
 1988 NCAA Division III football season
 1988 NAIA Division I football season
 1988 NAIA Division II football season